Nina Brown Baker (December 31, 1888–September 1, 1957) was an American author of biographies aimed at children.

Biography
Nina Brown was born in Galena, Kansas on December 31, 1888, to Frank Brown and Belle née Warren. Baker attended the University of Colorado where she completed a teaching certificate, graduating in 1911. She worked in Galena for a year before moving to Alison, Colorado to run a small school. The experience was uncomfortable; the town was little more than a couple of buildings and Baker was required to chop her own wood and other chores. She needed to ride a horse, an activity she had never learned before. She returned to Kansas city where she did business courses and took office jobs. There she met her husband and after marriage her teaching career was over.

Baker had first submitted a story which was accepted when she was nineteen. She had earned twenty five dollars for a short story to Good Housekeeping. When she was no longer teaching Baker returned to writing and had various pieces published leading to her first mystery book for children in 1931. She wrote several similar mystery stories before moving on, in about 1940, to writing biographies of famous individuals aimed at young people. By the end of her career she had produced over 25 books.

Personal life
Baker married Sydney J. Baker in 1915. The couple had two daughters, Berenice and Nina. They moved around from Omaha to St. Louis and Chicago before settling in Brooklyn Heights in 1938. Baker died at home on September 1, 1957.

Selected works
 Cyclone in calico : the story of Mary Ann Bickerdyke
 Amerigo Vespucci
 Juarez : hero of Mexico
 Juan Ponce de León
 He wouldn't be king : the story of Simón Bolívar
 Nickels and dimes : the story of F.W. Woolworth
 Peter the Great
 Sir Walter Raleigh
 Henry Hudson
 The story of Christopher Columbus
 The Chinese riddle, a mystery story for girls
 The Secret of Hallam House

References

1888 births
1957 deaths
20th-century American writers
20th-century American women writers